North Solent is a  biological and  geological Site of Special Scientific Interest along the north bank of the Solent between East End and Calshot in Hampshire. It is a Nature Conservation Review site, Grade I.  Part of it is in North Solent National Nature Reserve and two areas are Geological Conservation Review sites. It is part of Solent and Southampton Water Ramsar site and  Special Protection Area, and of Solent Maritime Special Area of Conservation. Boldre Foreshore is a local nature reserve.

This site has diverse habitats, including mudflats, saltmarshes, beaches, marshes, grassland and woods. It has rich insect populations and is of international importance for its wintering and migratory wildfowl and waders. Stone Point is important for studies of Quaternary stratigraphy, and it has many fossils dating to the Eemian interglacial, around 120,000 years ago.

References

Sites of Special Scientific Interest in Hampshire
Geological Conservation Review sites
National nature reserves in England
Nature Conservation Review sites
Ramsar sites in England
Special Areas of Conservation in England
Special Protection Areas in England